Veradilla is a rural locality in the Lockyer Valley Region, Queensland, Australia.

History 
The locality was named and bounded on 18 February 2000.

Geography
Lockyer Creek forms the northern boundary.

Road infrastructure
The Gatton Clifton Road (State Route 80) passes to the east.

References 

Lockyer Valley Region
Localities in Queensland